Yan Ni (born 2 March 1987) is a Chinese retired volleyball player who won the gold medal in the 2016 Summer Olympics. On club level, she played for Liaoning. She announced her retirement from volleyball in November 2021.

Career
Yan won the gold medal in the 2015 World Cup, 2016 Summer Olympics, and 2019 World Cup with China women's national volleyball team.

Yan was awarded the Best Middle Blocker at 2018 FIVB World Championship and 2019 World Cup. In 2014 AVC cup, Yan won both the MVP and Best Middle Blocker awards.

Clubs
  Liaoning (2005–2021)

Awards

Individuals
 2006 Asian Junior Championship "Most Valuable Player"
 2006 Asian Junior Championship "Best Blocker"
 2011–2012 Chinese Volleyball League "Best Blocker"
 2013–2014 Chinese Volleyball League "Best Blocker"
 2014 Asian Cup "Most Valuable Player"
 2014 Asian Cup "Best Middle Blocker"
 2015 Asian Championship "Best Middle Blockers"
 2018 World Championship "Best Middle Blockers"
 2019 FIVB World Cup "Best Middle Blockers"

Clubs
 2005–2006 Chinese Volleyball League -  Champion, with Liaoning
 2006–2007 Chinese Volleyball League -  Runner-Up, with Liaoning
 2007–2008 Chinese Volleyball League -  Runner-Up, with Liaoning

National team
 2014 Asian Cup Championship -  Gold Medal
 2014 Asian Games -  Silver Medal
 2015 Asian Championship -  Gold Medal
 2015 World Cup -  Gold Medal
 2016 Summer Olympics -  Gold Medal
 2017 World Grand Champions Cup -  Gold Medal
 2018 Volleyball Nations League -  Bronze Medal
 2018 Asian Games -  Gold Medal
 2018 World Championship -  Bronze Medal
 2019 World Cup -  Gold Medal

References

1987 births
Living people
Volleyball players from Shenyang
Chinese women's volleyball players
Olympic gold medalists for China in volleyball
Volleyball players at the 2016 Summer Olympics
2016 Olympic gold medalists for China
Asian Games medalists in volleyball
Volleyball players at the 2014 Asian Games
Volleyball players at the 2018 Asian Games
Medalists at the 2014 Asian Games
Medalists at the 2018 Asian Games
Asian Games gold medalists for China
Asian Games silver medalists for China
Middle blockers
Volleyball players at the 2020 Summer Olympics
21st-century Chinese women